American singer and actress Ashley Tisdale has released three studio albums, one soundtrack album, one extended play, and ten singles. Prior to launching a musical career of her own, Tisdale starred as Sharpay Evans on the popular Disney Channel Original Movie High School Musical in 2006. Consequently, it became a franchise that released several soundtracks, in which she performed under character. The 2006 soundtrack became the top-selling album in the United States that year. With  "What I've Been Looking For" and "Bop to the Top", both singles from that soundtrack, she became the first female artist to debut with two songs simultaneously on the US Billboard Hot 100.

The success of the High School Musical series led Warner Bros. Records to offer her a record deal. After signing with the label, she immediately started work on her debut album. Entitled Headstrong, her first album was released in February 2007, debuted at number five on Billboard 200, and was later certified Gold by the Recording Industry Association of America (RIAA) for shipments of over 500,000 units. To promote the album, four singles were released, including "He Said She Said", which is Tisdale's most successful single in the United States.

Tisdale began work on her second studio album soon after she finished promoting High School Musical 3: Senior Year in 2008. Guilty Pleasure was released in 2009 and debuted at number twelve on Billboard 200, selling 25,000 copies in the first week; this was significantly lower than the first-week sales for her previous album. The lead single "It's Alright, It's OK" had moderate commercial performance in some European countries.

In 2013, Tisdale announced she has been recording for her third studio album. In December, 2013, she announced she would be releasing a charity single titled "You're Always Here" written about her late grandfather. The song was eventually released independently to digital stores that same month.

Albums

Studio albums

Soundtrack albums

Video albums

Extended plays

Singles

As lead artist

As featured artist

Promotional singles

Other charted songs

Music videos

Footnotes

References

Discography
Discographies of American artists
Pop music discographies